Sunset Hill Cemetery, located northwest of the intersection of North Oak Street and West Mary Street, is the oldest cemetery in Valdosta, Georgia.

Notable burials
These are some of the notable people interred in the cemetery:

 Ellis Clary (1916–2000). MLB player
 Jack Rudolph (1938–2019). Professional football player
 Colonel William S. West (1849–1914). Builder of The Crescent (also listed as a National Historic Landmark in Lowndes County) and US Senator.

History
The cemetery was established in 1861 when former local postmaster Charles Ogden Force donated  to the city for this purpose.  It was added to the National Register of Historic Places on September 10, 2004.

See also
 National Register of Historic Places listings in Lowndes County, Georgia

References

External links
 
 Sunset Hill Cemetery
 
 

Cemeteries on the National Register of Historic Places in Georgia (U.S. state)
Geography of Lowndes County, Georgia
1861 establishments in Georgia (U.S. state)
National Register of Historic Places in Lowndes County, Georgia